Brendon Reading (born 26 January 1989) is an Australian racewalker. He competed at the 2016 Summer Olympics in Rio de Janeiro, in the men's 50 kilometres walk.

References

External links

1989 births
Living people
Australian male racewalkers
Olympic athletes of Australia
Athletes (track and field) at the 2016 Summer Olympics